Butts Junction was a railway junction, located just west of Alton in Hampshire, England.

It was at  where the Basingstoke and Alton Light Railway and the Meon Valley Railway diverged from the Mid-Hants line from Alton to Winchester. All of these lines had closed by 1973, with the Watercress line reopening as a heritage railway in 1977. The location of the junction can be seen from on board the train at the Watercress Line, with an embankment tailing off in a different direction. There used to be a reasonably large signal box located on this site which was an LSWR type 4.

References
 Old Hampshire Gazetteer
 Diagram of the junction

Rail transport in Hampshire
Rail junctions in England
Alton, Hampshire